"The Night I Fell in Love" is a song on the Pet Shop Boys' 2002 album Release. The lyrics were written by Neil Tennant and the music co-written with Chris Lowe.

The song describes a homosexual encounter between a teenage boy (who is telling the story) and his rap music idol after a concert. The idol is never named, but references in the lyrics to Dr. Dre and homophobia in rap music make it possible to identify him as music superstar Eminem. The most obvious reference is when the musician refers to Eminem's song "Stan":

 Then he joked "hey man,your name isn't Stan, is it?We should be together!"

Discussing the song's inspiration Tennant said: "Eminem's defence of the homophobic lyrics on his albums has always been that he's not speaking as himself, he's speaking as a character, and he's representing homophobia in America...I thought it would be quite interesting to take that method and just to imagine a scene where a boy meets a famous rap star backstage at his concert and is surprised to discover he's gay and ends up sleeping with him. Just to present rap in this homosexual context. I mean, there obviously are gay rap stars."

Eminem responded to the track in his song "Canibitch", in which Eminem and Dr. Dre run over the Pet Shop Boys with their car:

 [BOOSH! BOOSH!][BOOSH! BOOSH!](What was that?) Pet Shop Boys

Reception 
If buying this album is the only way you can hear it, don't hesitate."

References 

2002 songs
Pet Shop Boys songs
LGBT-related songs
Songs written by Neil Tennant
Songs written by Chris Lowe